Helen Joan Stenborg (January 24, 1925 – March 22, 2011) was an American actress of stage, screen, and television. She occasionally acted with her husband, actor Barnard Hughes (1915–2006), to whom she was married for 56 years from 1950 until his death in 2006; they had two children.

Career
Stenborg appeared on stage in revivals of A Doll's House, A Month in the Country, and The Crucible; the original, belated US production of Noël Coward's Waiting in the Wings, for which she was nominated for a Tony Award for Best Featured Actress in a Play; and the Lanford Wilson plays, The Rimers of Eldritch and Talley & Son winning the Obie Award for her performance in the latter.

She portrayed Helga Lindeman on the soap opera Another World from 1977 to 1978. Stenborg also appeared in the 1999 film, My Mother Dreams the Satan's Disciples in New York, which won an Academy Award for Best Short Subject in 2000.

Death
She died on March 22, 2011, aged 86, in New York City.

Partial filmography
Three Days of the Condor (1975) - Mrs. Edwina Russell
The Europeans (1979) - Mrs. Acton
Starting Over (1979) - Older Woman
The Bonfire of the Vanities (1990) - Mrs. McCoy
Me and Veronica (1993) - Woman at Laundromat
Marvin's Room (1996) - Nun on Phone
Isn't She Great (2000) - Aunt Abigail
Bless the Child (2000) - Sister Joseph
Enchanted (2007) - Ballroom Lady #1
The Caller (2008) - Jimmy's Mother
Doubt (2008) - Sister Teresa (final film role)

References

External links

 Barnard Hughes and Helen Stenborg papers, 1880s-2011, held by Billy Rose Theatre Division, New York Public Library for the Performing Arts.

1925 births
2011 deaths
Actresses from Minnesota
American film actresses
American stage actresses
American soap opera actresses
Obie Award recipients
Actresses from Minneapolis
Deaths from cancer in New York (state)
21st-century American women